Mignanelli is a surname. Notable people with the surname include:

Bertrando de Mignanelli ((1370–1455 or 1460), Italian merchant
Daniele Mignanelli (born 1993), Italian footballer
Fabio Mignanelli (d. 1557), Italian Roman Catholic bishop
Giacomo Mignanelli (d. 1576), Italian Roman Catholic prelate
Matt Mignanelli (born 1983), American artist